"Down on the Corner" is a song by the American band Creedence Clearwater Revival. It appeared on their fourth studio album, Willy and the Poor Boys (1969). The song peaked at No. 3 on the Billboard Hot 100 on 20 December 1969.  The flip side, "Fortunate Son", reached No. 14 on the United States charts on 22 November 1969, the week before Billboard changed its methodology on double-sided hits.

In Canada, the single reached No. 4 in December 1969, and No. 5 in New Zealand. The song performed better in much of Continental Europe, where it made number 2 in Germany, number 9 in Austria, number 8 in the Netherlands, number 17 in Flemish-speaking Belgium and number 6 in French-speaking Belgium than in the United Kingdom, where it stalled at number 31.

Content
The song depicts the fictional band Willy and the Poor Boys, and how they play on street corners to cheer people up and ask for nickels.

Songwriter John Fogerty explained how the lyrics were derived:

The song makes reference to a harmonica, washboard, a kazoo, a Kalamazoo guitar, and a gut bass. In a 1969 appearance on The Music Scene TV show, the band performed the song dressed up as “Willy and the Poor Boys”. Stu Cook played a gut bass, Doug Clifford the washboard, and Tom Fogerty the Kalamazoo, which mimicked the appearance of the band as they appear on the album cover.

Billboard described the single as having "an infectious calypso beat."

Certifications

References 

Creedence Clearwater Revival songs
Songs written by John Fogerty
Jerry Reed songs
Song recordings produced by John Fogerty
1969 singles
1969 songs
Fantasy Records singles